Other specified paraphilic disorder is the term used by the fifth edition of the Diagnostic and Statistical Manual of Mental Disorders (DSM-5) to refer to any of the many other paraphilic disorders that are not explicitly named in the manual. Along with unspecified paraphilic disorder, it replaced the DSM-IV-TR category paraphilia not otherwise specified (PNOS). 

Examples listed by the DSM-5 are telephone scatologia, necrophilia, zoophilia, coprophilia, klismaphilia, and urophilia. Partialism was considered a Paraphilia NOS in the DSM-IV, but was subsumed into fetishistic disorder by the DSM-5. In order to be diagnosable, the interest must be recurrent and intense, present for at least six months, and cause marked distress or impairment in important areas of functioning. When a specific paraphilia cannot be identified or the clinician chooses not to specify it for some other reason, the unspecified paraphilic disorder diagnosis may be used instead.

See also 
Courtship disorder
Erotic target location error
List of paraphilias

References 

-